Hitman's Run is a 1999 film directed by Mark L. Lester.

Plot
A former mob hitman, now in witness protection, is forced to come out of retirement when his family is threatened by his cohorts. He teams up with a skateboarding kid, who has a computer disk that the mob wants to get their hands on that has a list of new names for individuals in the FBI witness protection program. The list includes his dad, who separated from his mother years before and hadn't been seen since.

Cast
Eric Roberts  ...  Tony Lazorka / John Dugan  
Esteban Powell  ...  Brian Penny  
C. Thomas Howell  ...  Tom Holly  
Farrah Forke  ...  Sarah    
Michael D. Roberts ... FBI Director Dean Harris
Brent Huff ... Randall Garrett

References

External links

1999 films
1999 action films
American action films
Films directed by Mark L. Lester
1990s English-language films
1990s American films